The Oppo R17 (RX17 in Europe) is a line of Android phablets manufactured by Oppo. It comprises the Oppo R17, R17 Pro, and R17 Neo, which were officially unveiled on August 23, 2018 for the Chinese market. The R17 was the first smartphone to receive Oppo's "Hyper Boost Acceleration Engine," which provides improvements in gaming performance, system, and app usage.

Specifications

Oppo R17

Hardware
The OPPO R17 is powered by 2*2.0 GHz 360 Gold & 6*1.7 GHz Kryo 360 Silver octa-core processor with Qualcomm Snapdragon 670 Chipset, and has 6GB of RAM and 128GB of storage. It operates on ColorOS 5.2 which is a customized version of Android 8.1 (Oreo). It has a 25 MP front camera and 16MP + 5 MP rear cameras. And the OPPO R17 has 3500 mAh batteries and is powered by VOOC fast wired charging.

Memory
The OPPO R17 has a 128GB built-in memory and 2microSD slots which supports up to 256GB of additional storage.

Display
The Oppo R17 has a 6.4-inch AMOLED capacitive display covered by Corning Gorilla Glass 6. It is also the first phone in the world to have this glass. Under the display is an in-screen fingerprint sensor as standard.

Colors 
Oppo also start to sell a new color option for the R17 named as  last November 11 in China.

Camera 
Its dual rear cameras are a 16 MP main camera and a 5 MP depth sensor equipped with AI Scene and Object Recognition, while its front camera has 25 mega pixels.

Software 
The Oppo R17 runs on Color OS 5.2, based on Android 8.1. and has a Google Assistant and Lens feature on its software.

Oppo R17 Pro

Hardware
The OPPO R17 Pro is powered by 2*2.2 GHz Kryo 360 Gold & 6*1.7 GHz Kryo 360 Silver octa-core processor with Qualcomm Snapdragon 710 Chipset, and has 6GB/8GB of RAM and 128GB of storage. It operates on ColorOS 5.2 which is a customized version of Android 8.1 (Oreo). It has a 25 MP front camera and three rear cameras, include the world's first time of flight depth-sensing camera. And the OPPO R17 Pro has two 1850 mAh batteries and is powered by VOOC fast wired charging which charges 40% of battery in 10 minutes.

Sim Slot

SIM Card Type: Nano-SIM / Nano-USIM

Connectivity

GPS: GPS/A-GPS/GLONASS/Beidou/Galileo

Bluetooth: 5.0

WLAN Function: 2.4/5.1/5.8GHz

OTG: Support

NFC: Support

Memory
The OPPO R17 Pro has a 128GB built-in memory and 2microSD slots which supports up to 256GB of additional storage.

Display
The OPPO R17 Pro features a 6.4-inch (16.2cm) 1080x2340 pixel, AMOLED on-cell touchscreen: Multi-touch, Capacitive Screen, with a pixel density of 402 pixels per inch, and an aspect ratio of 19.5:9. Its resolution is 2340 by 1080 pixels. The display is covered by a single pane of Corning Gorilla Glass 6.

Colors 

Camera 
It has three cameras on the rear. It has a 12 million pixel depth sensor, a 20 million pixel camera with Dual-Aperture and AI ultra-clear engine. One is a 20MP wide-angle camera with f/2.6 aperture, and the other with dual pixel PDAF, optical image stabilization and an aperture of f/2.4. The front facing camera is 25-megapixels with an f/2.0 aperture powered by AI.

Software
The OPPO R17 Pro is equipped with the ColorOS 5.2 which based on Android 8.1 "Oreo" mobile operating system.

Oppo R17 Neo (a.k.a. Oppo K1) 
The phone comes with multiple names. 64GB version in China is called K1 while 128GB is called R15x. International version is called R17 Neo while RX17 Neo is used in Europe.

Colors 

Camera 
It has a 16 MP + 2 MP dual-rear camera while it uses a 25 MP front camera

Performance 
Neo uses a 4+128 GB of memory combination with a 1.95 GHz tuned-down Qualcomm Snapdragon 660 Processor.
R15x uses a 6+128 GB of memory combination with the same processor.
K1 has two combination:4+64 or 6+64 GB. The differences between them are only the name and memory combination.

Availability

Global 
The OPPO R17 and R17 Pro were posted on their global website the same date where it was in their Singapore web on October 6, 2018. The phones' web catalog is on English language. They were available to the public on October 10, 2018. Meanwhile, before their availability, Oppo added a special website regarding the R-Series' heritage and history. A video was posted on YouTube related to the R-Series' history.

An official product video for the R17 was released on October 17, 2018 on YouTube. Meanwhile, a full video for the R17 Pro filmed in London was released on October 30, 2018.

China 
The R17, together with the R17 Pro, were available on August 30, 2018, in China.

Italy 
Named as the RX17 and RX17 Pro, they were revealed at Milan, Italy on November 6, 2018.

Philippines 
A special event for the launch of the R17 Pro was launched in the Philippines last November 7, 2018.

India 
The Oppo R17 Pro was launched in India on December 4. 2018

References 

Mobile phones with multiple rear cameras
Android (operating system) devices
Mobile phones introduced in 2018
Oppo smartphones